Sudhir Ruparelia (born 17 January 1956) is a Ugandan business magnate and investor of Indian origin. He is the chairman and majority shareholder in the companies of the Ruparelia Group. His investments are mainly in the areas of banking, insurance, education, broadcasting, real estate, floriculture, hotels, and resorts.

According to Forbes in 2015, Ruparelia was the wealthiest individual in Uganda and Africa's 27th, with an estimated net worth of US$800 million  he got dropped from the Forbes list in 2016 and has never been featured to date(2023). 

On 20 October 2016, the Bank of Uganda, which regulates all banks in Uganda, took control of Crane Bank, the largest subsidiary of the Ruparelia Group, due to a significant decline in capital and a potential run on the bank.

In April 2017, the central bank of Uganda shut down his four forex bureaux as a result of unrenewed expired licences whose failed renewal resulted from money laundering and lack of fitness and probity by owners and board of directors according to Forbes and the Observer.

Biography
Ruparelia was born in Kabatoro, Kasese District in the Western Region of Uganda to an upper-middle-class Indian Gujarati family. His great-grandfather reached Mombasa, Kenya in 1897 from India and set up a trading store there before coming to Uganda in 1903. His grandfather was born in Uganda in 1908 and his father in 1932.

Ruparelia has two sisters and one brother. He attended Bat Valley Primary School in Kampala, from P1 to P6, then Jinja Main Street Primary School in Jinja for P7 and Jinja Secondary School. In 1971, he joined Kololo Senior Secondary School. Ruparelia fled to the United Kingdom with his parents in 1972 at the age of 16, when the dictator Idi Amin expelled all Asians from Uganda.

Ruparelia returned to Uganda in 1985, with US$25,000 earned from several casual jobs including working in supermarkets, factories, and butcheries. Ruparelia started selling beer and spirits imported from Kenya. In 1989, beer importation was banned to encourage local brewing of alcohol and he realized he could not make beer. But since his customers, who were mainly foreigners, paid him in foreign currency, he started Crane Forex Bureau, the first in Uganda. With his profits, Ruparelia ventured into other businesses, including forming Crane Bank in 1995. Later, he organized his businesses under the umbrella of the Ruparelia Group.

In 2007, Ruparelia was awarded an honorary Doctor of Laws degree in business, by the Uganda Pentecostal University, in recognition of his contribution to Uganda's economic growth.

Personal life
Ruparelia has been married to Jyotsna since 1977. Together, they are parents to three children. Meera, the oldest, has been married to Ravi Kotecha since 2014. Rajiv is their only son, and Sheena is the younger daughter.

Diplomatic Work
In February 2020, Ruparelia was appointed as honorary Consul of the Republic of Nepal to Uganda, by Bidhya Devi Bhandari, the president of Nepal. On 17 March 2020, he presented his credentials to Samuel Kutesa, Uganda's foreign minister. He reports to the nearest substantive Nepalese embassy, in Cairo, Egypt.

See also
 List of wealthiest people in Uganda
 List of banks in Uganda
 Banking in Uganda

References

External links
Sudhir Ruparelia Makes Cover of Forbes Africa
History of The Ruparelia Group of Companies
Court Orders Sudhir Arrest
Sudhir abandons dollars for Shillings in property rent

Living people
1956 births
Ambassadors of Nepal
Ugandan people of Indian descent
Businesspeople in education
Businesspeople in agriculture
Businesspeople in the hospitality industry
Ugandan businesspeople in real estate
Ruparelia Group